Pukap Siqin (Quechua puka red, siqi line, -p, -n suffixes, also spelled Pucapsiquin) is a mountain in the Cordillera Central in the Andes of Peru which reaches a height of approximately . It is located in the Lima Region, Yauyos Province, Laraos District.

References 

Mountains of Peru
Mountains of Lima Region